Rittal is a German manufacturer of electrical enclosures for use in industrial settings. Founded in 1961, Rittal is a subsidiary of the Friedhelm Loh Group. The name Rittal is derived from the place where the company was founded – Rittershausen in Dietzhölztal. The company headquarters is in Herborn.

Products
Rittal is a German provider of industrial enclosure systems including power distribution and climate control as well as for IT infrastructure and software and services. Enclosures from Rittal are used in:

 Electrical engineering and automation
 Renewable energies
 Information technology
 Infrastructure
 Mechanical engineering
 Transport technology

Locations
This list contains the Rittal sales locations worldwide. The production sites are highlighted in blue.

Sponsorships
Rittal sponsors a number of football and handball clubs in the region, including HSG Wetzlar. From March 2006 until the end of 2021, the company sponsored the Mittelhessen-Arena in Wetzlar as the Rittal Arena Wetzlar. Rittal was also a major sponsor of Hessentag 2016 in Herborn.

References

External links

Friedhelm Loh Group

Companies based in Hesse
Electrical engineering companies of Germany